Leslie or Lesley Miller may refer to:
 Leslie A. Miller (1886–1970), governor of Wyoming, U.S.
 Leslie Anne Miller, Pennsylvania attorney
 Leslie Miller (cricketer) (1880–1963), Australian cricketer
 Leslie Miller (athlete) (born 1948), Bahamian Olympic sprinter, businessman, and politician
 Leslie Adrienne Miller (born 1956), American poet
 Leslie W. Miller, American cardiologist
 Les Miller (American football) (Leslie Miller, born 1965), American football player
 Les Miller (footballer) (Leslie Miller, 1911–1959), footballer
 Les Miller (Florida politician) (born 1951), American politician
 Sir Leslie Creery Miller (1862-1925), British Indian civil servant and judge